Daniel Ançay (born 25 July 1970) is a retired Swiss football goalkeeper.

References

1970 births
Living people
Swiss men's footballers
FC Sion players
FC Monthey players
AC Bellinzona players
Association football goalkeepers
Swiss Super League players